Mohammed Hassan Helmy (13 February 1912 – 5 November 1986) commonly known as Helmy Zamora, was an Egyptian footballer who played for Zamalek and Egypt as a left winger.
He was the club's President for 3 periods, between 1967 and 1984.

He represented Egypt in the 1936 Summer Olympics, but he did not play in any matches.

Honors
Zamalek SC
Egypt Cup: (5)
 1935, 1938, 1941, 1943, 1944
Cairo League: (6)
 1939–40, 1940–41, 1943–44, 1944–45, 1945–46, 1946–47

References 

1912 births
1986 deaths
People from Qalyubiyya Governorate
Egyptian footballers
Egypt international footballers
Zamalek SC players
Footballers at the 1936 Summer Olympics
Olympic footballers of Egypt
Zamalek SC presidents
Association football midfielders